The Grupo de Astronomía y Ciencias del Espacio (Group of Astronomy and Space Sciences, GACE-UV) is an astrophysics research group, part of the Image Processing Laboratory (IPL) in the University of Valencia.

It is located in the Parc Científic in Paterna, Valencia.

See also
 List of astronomical societies

References

External links 
 GACE
 IPL

Astrophysics
Astronomy organizations
Valencia